Tham Kong Lo or Kong Lor Cave is a karst limestone cave in Phu Hin Bun National Park, in Khammouane Province, Laos. The karst formation is dramatic and the cave has been cited as a "one of Southeast Asia's geological wonders".

The cave is deep (lasting about ) and wide and as high as 300 feet in parts. The locals in recent years have set up vendors at the location to provide to tourists. Inside the cave is a pool which glows a bright emerald colour which locals hold as sacred, believing it to reflect the skin of the Hindi god Indra.

References

External links
Video

Caves of Laos
Geography of Khammouane province
Limestone caves